South Colby is an unincorporated community in Kitsap County, Washington, United States. From there, a ferry is available to Fauntleroy in the West Seattle neighborhood of Seattle. South Colby is part of the Southworth census-designated place.

Colby is a shortening and alteration of "Coal Bay".

References

Unincorporated communities in Washington (state)
Unincorporated communities in Kitsap County, Washington